The following is a list of films originally produced and/or distributed theatrically by Paramount Pictures and released in the 1940s. All films (with few exceptions) are currently owned by Universal Television through EMKA, Ltd.

References

External links
 Paramount Pictures Complete Library

 1940–1949
American films by studio
1940s in American cinema
Lists of 1940s films